Andreas Kuffner (born 11 March 1987 in Vilshofen) is a German representative rower. He is a dual Olympian, an Olympic gold & silver medallist and a world champion.

He was in the crew that won the gold medal at the men's eight competition at the 2012 Summer Olympics in London.  At the 2016 Summer Olympics in Rio de Janeiro, he rowed in Germany's Men's eight which won the silver medal. Those nine 2016 Olympic silver medal rowers were awarded the Silbernes Lorbeerblatt (Silver Laurel Leaf), Germany's highest sports award, for their achievements. It was Kuffner's second such award having been similarly recognised for his 2012 Olympic gold.

References

External links

 
 
 
 

1987 births
Living people
Rowers at the 2012 Summer Olympics
Olympic rowers of Germany
Olympic gold medalists for Germany
Olympic medalists in rowing
Medalists at the 2012 Summer Olympics
World Rowing Championships medalists for Germany
German male rowers
Rowers at the 2016 Summer Olympics
Olympic silver medalists for Germany
Medalists at the 2016 Summer Olympics
European Rowing Championships medalists
Recipients of the Silver Laurel Leaf